Gabbeh (Persian: گبه) is a 1996 Iranian film directed by Mohsen Makhmalbaf. It was screened in the Un Certain Regard section at the 1996 Cannes Film Festival. The film was selected as the Iranian entry for the Best Foreign Language Film at the 70th Academy Awards, but was not accepted as a nominee.

The film gets its name from a type of Persian rug and starts by showing an elderly couple, carrying their gabbeh, walking toward the river hoping to wash their rug. When the rug is spread on the ground, a girl, referred to as Gabbeh, magically comes out of it. The film follows her story and audience learn about her family, her uncle who is hoping to find a bride, and most importantly her longing for a young man she hopes to marry.

The picture was banned in Iran for being "subversive".

Cast
 Abbas Sayah as Uncle
 Shaghayeh Djodat as Gabbeh
 Hossein Moharami as Old Man
 Rogheih Moharami as Old Woman
 Parvaneh Ghalandari

Awards 
 Best Director and Special Critics Award, Sitges Film Festival, 1996
 Silver Screen Award, Singapore International Film Festival
 Best Artistic Contribution Award, Tokyo International Film Festival
 One of 10 selected films by critics – Times (USA) 1996.

See also
 List of submissions to the 70th Academy Awards for Best Foreign Language Film
 List of Iranian submissions for the Academy Award for Best Foreign Language Film

References

External links
Makhmalbaf Film House

1996 films
Iranian drama films
1990s Persian-language films
Films directed by Mohsen Makhmalbaf
1996 drama films
Film controversies in Iran